The Coombe Historic District is a national historic district located at Felton, Kent County, Delaware.  It encompasses two contributing buildings and one contributing structure near the town of Felton representing an unusual mixture of archaeological resources, both prehistoric and historic, in combination with two excellent examples of domestic architecture from the 18th and 19th centuries.  They are the brick Benjamin Coombe House, built in 1778, and the frame Caldwell House, built about 1872, with their respective outbuildings. It also includes the Hopkins Cemetery, begun in the late-19th century, and three historic archaeological house sites, as well as an area of prehistoric occupation that was listed in the National Register of Historic Places in 1979 as "Area F" in the Hughes Early Man Complex.

It was listed on the National Register of Historic Places in 1982.

References

Historic districts in Kent County, Delaware
Historic districts on the National Register of Historic Places in Delaware
National Register of Historic Places in Kent County, Delaware